Kamil Majchrzak and Martin Redlicki were the defending champions, having won the event in 2013. However, neither participated in the 2014 event; Redlicki's age by the 2014 event's qualifying cutoff made him ineligible to continue to participate in junior events and Majchrzak chose not to participate.

Omar Jasika and Naoki Nakagawa won the tournament after beating Rafael Matos and João Menezes in the final, 6–3, 7–6(8–6).

Seeds

Draw

Finals

Top half

Bottom half

References

External links 
 Draw

Boys' Doubles
US Open, 2014 Boys' Doubles